The 2005 Saint Francis Red Flash football team represented Saint Francis University as a member of the Northeast Conference (NEC) during the 2005 NCAA Division I FCS football season. The Red Flash were led by fourth-year head coach Dave Opfar. It was the final season in which the team played their home games at the Pine Bowl. They finished the season 3–8 overall and 3–5 in NEC play to place in a three-way tie for third place.

Schedule

References

Saint Francis
Saint Francis Red Flash football seasons
Saint Francis Red Flash football